WCD may stand for:

World Commission on Dams
Worst Case Discharge
Wearable cardioverter defibrillator
World Compassion Day